is a town located in Kanoashi District, Shimane Prefecture, Japan.

It was formed on October 1, 2005 from the merger of the town of Muikaichi, and the village of Kakinoki, both from Kanoashi District.

As of March 1, 2017 the town has a population of 6,231 and a density of 19 persons per km². The area is 336.29 km².

Geography

Climate
Yoshika has a humid subtropical climate (Köppen climate classification Cfa) with very warm summers and cool winters. Precipitation is abundant throughout the year.

Demographics
Per Japanese census data, the population of Masuda in 2020 is 6,077 people. Masuda has been conducting censuses since 1920.

Notable people from Yoshika
Hanae Mori, fashion designer

References

External links

Yoshika official website 

Towns in Shimane Prefecture